Language and Mind is a 1968 book of three essays on linguistics by Noam Chomsky. An expanded edition in 1972 added three essays and a new preface.

References

Bibliography

Further reading 

 
 
 
 
 

1968 non-fiction books
Books by Noam Chomsky
English-language books
Harcourt (publisher) books
Linguistics books